Neocoenyra fulleborni is a butterfly in the family Nymphalidae. It is found in southern Tanzania. The habitat consists of submontane and montane grassland and shrubland at altitudes between 1,500 and 1,800 meters.

References

Satyrini
Butterflies described in 1903
Endemic fauna of Tanzania
Butterflies of Africa